Pingguo is a city of west-central Guangxi, China. It is the easternmost county-level division of the prefecture-level city of Baise. Two thirds of the population are Zhuang.

The Pingguo Industry Park hosts an important part of China's aluminum industry.

Since 2009, an ITF international tennis tournament has been held annually in Pingguo.

Administrative divisions 
There are nine towns and three townships in the city:

Towns:
Matou, Xin'an, Guohua, Taiping, Pozao, Sitang, Jiucheng, Bangxu, Fengwu Town

Townships:
Haicheng Township, Liming Township, Tonglao Township

Climate

See also
 Pingguoyuan (disambiguation)

References

External links

 
Counties and cities in Baise